The Bioindustry Park Silvano Fumero (BiPCa) is a Science and Technology Park located in Canavese near Turin in the north-west of Italy.
The park was founded to promote and develop biotechnological research, to host companies operating research and development, and pilot production in the life science sector. Companies such as Merck Serono and Bracco chose the Park as the location for their research and development activities.

Services
The Park offers a complete set of support services to R&D activities, not only offering research facilities and scientific services, but also flexible and attractive financing solutions, sound project management and results evaluation. 

The park is the owner of the Laboratory for Advanced Methodologies (LIMA) which performs exploitation of scientific results in the fields of Chemistry, Molecular Biology, Proteomics and Bioinformatics. LIMA, thanks to its solid co-operation with the University of Turin and CNR ISPA (Consiglio Nazionale delle Ricerche), is also a permanent training site for graduates and researchers. 

A University Center in Imaging Technologies (CEIP) managed by University of Torino is also active and is focused on the use of different technologies (MRI, Ultrasound, X-ray, etc.) in order to evaluate new solutions in the diagnosis and assessment of the efficacy and efficiency of drugs.

Start-ups
In 2005 BiPCa has launched, with the support of Regione Piemonte, the Discovery initiative to identify and select innovative entrepreneurial ideas in the Biotech field. Eight start-ups have already been created from the beginning of the project in partnership with Eporgen venture, a Seed capital company focused on investment in new innovative entrepreneurial projects in the biotech field.

Local cluster
Bioindustry Park is also acting as system integrator for the development of a local cluster, bioPmed (http://www.biopmed.eu).
Since 2009 Bioindustry Park acts as cluster management company for the development of the regional cluster bioPmed (www.biopmed.eu) on biotech and medtech. Created thanks to Regione Piemonte, it gathers more than 60 companies, research centres and three academic institutions (University of Turin, Università del Piemonte Orientale and  Turin Polytechnic), who signed an agreement to create, build, support and animate the local cluster. 

All the activities are carried out in cooperation with strong local actors, such as Turin Province and Turin Chamber of Commerce, CEIPiemonte, ALPS EEN and Patlib network and synergies with other local R&D initiatives are in place. The cluster is also founding member of the AlpsBioCluster (www.alpsbiocluster.eu) together with  Rhône-Alpes Region (France), Lombardy, South Tirol, Bavaria  and Western Switzerland that intends to promote and foster transalpine competitiveness in the biotech and medical sciences sectors.

External links 
 
The bioPmed Life science Cluster

Canavese
Science parks in Italy
Buildings and structures in Piedmont